Frisco is a ghost town in Beaver County, Utah, United States. It was an active mining camp from 1879 to 1929.
At its peak in 1885, Frisco was a thriving town of 6,000 people.

History

Frisco developed as the post office and commercial center for the San Francisco Mining District, and was the terminus of the Utah Southern Railroad extension from Milford. The Horn Silver Mine was discovered in 1875, and had produced $20,267,078 worth of ore by 1885. By 1885, over $60,000,000 worth of zinc, copper, lead, silver, and gold had been transported from Frisco from the many mines in the area.

With 23 saloons, Frisco was known as the wildest town in the Great Basin. Murder was common, and drinking water had to be freighted in.

Frisco's fortunes changed suddenly on February 13, 1885, when the Horn Silver Mine caved in completely.

In 1905 a Mormon ward was organized, but in 1911, with the closing of many of the mines, so many church members had left that the ward was discontinued.
After many years of desertion, another company made an attempt to mine here in 2002.

Geography

Demographics
The peak population was nearly 6,000.

See also

 List of ghost towns in Utah
 Silver mining in the United States

References

External links

 Photos by James Hammond
 History by Bob Bezzant and photos by Bob Bezzant and Dolores Steele
 Frisco Utah

Ghost towns in Utah
Mining communities in Utah
Populated places established in 1879
Ghost towns in Beaver County, Utah